Robert William Kee (born 1964) is a barrister from Auckland, New Zealand. He was the Director of Human Rights Proceedings.

Early life
Kee was educated at St Peter's College, Grafton (1975-1981) and he studied law at the University of Auckland.

Career
Kee practised law in Auckland as a barrister specialising in criminal law. He was appointed to the position of Director of Human Rights Proceedings on 15 October 2012.

Notes

1964 births
Living people
People educated at St Peter's College, Auckland
20th-century New Zealand lawyers
University of Auckland alumni
People from Auckland
21st-century New Zealand lawyers